Ray Perryman (born November 27, 1978) is a former American football defensive back. He was drafted in the fifth round of the 2001 NFL Draft. He played for the Baltimore Ravens in 2002, the Jacksonville Jaguars from 2003 to 2004 and for the Edmonton Eskimos in 2007.

References

1978 births
Living people
American football defensive backs
Northern Arizona Lumberjacks football players
Amsterdam Admirals players
Baltimore Ravens players
Jacksonville Jaguars players
Frankfurt Galaxy players
Edmonton Elks players